Datin Anthea Phillipps B.Sc. (born 3 June 1957) is a British botanist. Phillipps was brought up in Sabah, Malaysia, as a child (and still dwells there today). She received a Botany degree from the University of Durham, England. She worked at the Sabah Museum before joining the Sabah Parks service from 1980 to 1987 as Park Ecologist, where she studied rhododendrons and pitcher plants. She lives in Kota Kinabalu, the capital of Sabah, and is married to Datuk Anthony Lamb (with two children, Serena and Alexander Lamb).

Publications authored or coauthored by Phillipps include:
 A Guide to the Parks of Sabah (1988)
 Rhododendrons of Sabah (1988) (with A. Lamb, G. Argent & S. Collenette)
 Pitcher-Plants of Borneo (1996) (with Anthony Lamb)
 Kinabalu - Summit of Borneo (1996) (with K.M. Wong)
 Kinabalu Park, Sabah, Malaysian Borneo (2000) (with Francis Liew)
 The Rhododendrons of Sabah, Malaysian Borneo (2007) (with G. Argent & A. Lamb)

References

1957 births
Living people
British botanists
People from Sabah
Malaysian women scientists
Women botanists
British women scientists
Alumni of the College of St Hild and St Bede, Durham